Gazebo is an open-source 3D robotics simulator. It integrated the ODE physics engine, OpenGL rendering, and support code for sensor simulation and actuator control.

Gazebo can use multiple high-performance physics engines, such as ODE, Bullet, etc. (the default is ODE). It provides realistic rendering of environments including high-quality lighting, shadows, and textures. It can model sensors that "see" the simulated environment, such as laser range finders, cameras (including wide-angle), Kinect style sensors, etc.

For 3D rendering, Gazebo uses the OGRE engine.

Development history 
Gazebo was a component in the Player Project from 2004 through 2011. In 2011, Gazebo became an independent project supported by Willow Garage. In 2012, Open Source Robotics Foundation (OSRF) became the steward of the Gazebo project. OSRF changed its name to Open Robotics in 2018.

Gazebo's latest and last major release is version 11, a long-term support release with end-of-life planned for January 2025. All previously released versions of Gazebo also received long-term support, with minor updates being released for Gazebo 9 and 10 together with the release of Gazebo 11.0.0. With Gazebo 11 being released in January 2020, Open Robotics shifted its focus to developing Ignition, a "collection of open source software libraries designed to simplify development of high-performance applications", with a target audience of robot developers, designers, and educators. The first version of Ignition was released in February 2019. Ignition's website refers to the standalone Gazebo simulator as Gazebo Classic in order to disambiguate it from Ignition Gazebo, the Gazebo simulator that is now included in the latest releases of Ignition. Open Robotics mentioned the need for significant modernization in Gazebo's code, together with the opportunity to move from a monolithic architecture to a collection of loosely coupled libraries.

In April 2022 it was announced that the former Ignition is now called Gazebo.

Competitions 

Gazebo has been used as the simulation environment for a number of technology challenges and competitions.

DARPA Robotics Challenge (DRC) 

2012 to 2015
 The DRC was a prize competition funded by the US Defense Advanced Research Projects Agency. It aimed to develop semi-autonomous ground robots that could do "complex tasks in dangerous, degraded, human-engineered environments."
 The simulation stage, the Virtual Robotics Challenge, took place June 17–21, 2013 and was won by Team IHMC, Institute for Human and Machine Cognition, Pensacola, Fla.
 Link to simulation environment at https://bitbucket.org/osrf/drcsim

NASA Space Robotics Challenge (SRC) 

2016 to 2017
 The National Aeronautics and Space Administration (NASA) Space Robotics Competition tasks teams with developing and displaying the ability of an R5 (Valkyrie) robot to assist in the procedures of a NASA mission, such as one to Mars, offering a $1 million prize pool.
 NASA selected 20 finalist teams based on their performance completing some tasks in the Gazebo 3D robot simulator, and each of those finalists had to program a Valkyrie humanoid to complete a repair mission on a simulated Mars base.
 The winner of the SRC was team Coordinated Robotics.
 Link to simulation environment at https://bitbucket.org/osrf/srcsim

Toyota Prius Challenge 

2016 to 2017
 The Prius Challenge is a competition where participants battle it out to see who can achieve the best fuel economy and efficiency rating on a Prius within a target time range. Toyota Research Institute (TRI) welcome competitors to the event at Sonoma (CA) Raceway on March 3, 2017
 Open Robotics created a Gazebo-based simulation environment for the competition in which teams practiced and tested theories and strategies for the race-day competition
 Twenty teams competed in the event, which was won by Echo 12 with an average of 85 mpg and the winner for the best overall lap was Team El Diablo with 211 mpg
 Link to simulation environment at https://bitbucket.org/osrf/priuscup/src/default/
 Link to Prius Challenge at https://www.openrobotics.org/customer-stories/prius-challenge

Agile Robotics for Industrial Automation Competition (ARIAC) 

2016 to 2020

The National Institute of Standards and Technology (NIST) put on the first ARIAC Competition in June 2017. The goal of the competition was to test the agility of industrial robot systems, with the goal of enabling industrial robots on the shop floors to be more productive, more autonomous, and to require less time from shop floor workers.
 First place in the 2017 ARIAC competition was won by Realization of Robotics Systems, Center for Advanced Manufacturing, University of Southern California.
 First place in the 2018 ARIAC competition was won by Team Sirius, Denbar Robotics.
 First place in the 2019 ARIAC competition was won again by Team Sirius, Denbar Robotics.
 First place in the 2020 ARIAC competition was won by Team Virsli, Budapest University of Technology and Economics (BME VIK TMIT), HSN Lab, Cloud Robotics Group .
 Simulation environment at https://bitbucket.org/osrf/ariac/wiki/Home

DARPA Service Academy Swarm Challenge (SASC)

2016 to 2017
 DARPA created the Service Academies Swarm Challenge to help make effective unmanned aerial vehicle (UAV) swarm tactics a reality. The Challenge is a collaboration between DARPA and the three U.S. military Service academies—the United States Military Academy, the United States Naval Academy and the United States Air Force Academy.
 The U.S. Naval Academy was declared the winner of the competition
 Simulation environment at https://github.com/osrf/uctf

DARPA Subterranean Challenge (SubT) 

2018 to 2021
 The DARPA Subterranean or “SubT” Challenge seeks novel approaches to rapidly map, navigate, and search underground environments during time-sensitive combat operations or disaster response scenarios.
 Teams in the Virtual track will compete for up to $1.5 million in the Virtual Final event, with additional prizes of up to $500,000 for self-funded teams in each of the Virtual Circuit events.
 Simulation environment at https://bitbucket.org/osrf/subt/wiki/Home

Virtual RobotX Competition (VRX) 

2019
 The VRX is an international, university-level competition funded by the Office of Naval Research (ONR) and designed to broaden student's exposure to autonomy and maritime robotic technologies. Student teams will operate their vehicle in a Gazebo-based simulation environment built by Open Robotics and Naval Postgraduate School. Students will be tasked to develop innovative solutions to ensure their virtual USV can perform prescribed tasks in this environment. Tasks for this competition have been derived from RoboNation's Maritime RobotX Challenge.
 The competition is scheduled for December 2019.
 Project source code available at https://github.com/osrf/vrx

References

External links 
 Gazebo Simulator

Open Robotics
Free software projects
Robotics simulation software
Free software programmed in C++
Software using the Apache license